Dore or Doré may refer to:

Geography

Places 

Dore, South Yorkshire, England
Dore and Totley, electoral ward that includes this village
Abbey Dore, village in Herefordshire, England
Dore, in the district of Gweedore, Ireland
Dore Lake, Saskatchewan, a hamlet in Canada
 La Doré, a municipality of Quebec, Canada
Dore-l'Église, France
Mont-Dore, France
Le Mont-Dore (New Caledonia)

Rivers 
River Dore, Herefordshire, England
Dore (river), tributary river of the Allier in France
Doré River, British Columbia, Canada
Doré River, flowing into Doré Lake, Saskatchewan, Canada

Lakes 
 Lake Doré, Ontario, Canada
Doré Lake, Saskatchewan, Canada

Islands 
Dore Holm, Shetland Islands

People

Surname Dore
Charlie Dore (born 1956), English songwriter
Chris Dore, Australian journalist
David Dore (1940–2016), Canadian ice skating official
Elizabeth Dore, British historian of Latin America
Jimmy Dore (born 1965), American comedian
John Dore, Canadian basketball coach
John Clark Dore (1822–1900), American educator and politician
Jon Dore (born 1976), Canadian comedian and actor
Julie Dore (born 1960), British politician
Richard Dore (1749–1800), English lawyer and judge
Ronald P. Dore (1925–2018), British sociologist
Tim Dore (born 1973), American politician
Tom Dore (born 1958), American sports announcer
Valerie Dore (born 1963), Italian singer

Surname Doré 
Alexander Doré (1923–2002), British actor
André Doré (born 1958), former professional ice hockey player
Armand Doré (1824–1882), French painter
Daniel Doré (born 1970), former professional ice hockey right winger
Edna Doré (1921–2014), British actress
Gustave Doré (1832–1883), a French artist, engraver, illustrator and sculptor
Jean Doré (1944–2015), Canadian politician
Julien Doré (born 1982), French singer
Marie-Joseph-Camille Doré (1831–1888), captain in the French navy
Pierre Doré or Auratus (c. 1500–1559), French Dominican theologian

First name 
Dore Gold (born 1953), Israeli diplomat
Dore Schary (1905–1980), American writer and director

Other uses
Dore (film) or The Ruler, a 1995 Indian Kannada language feature film directed by Shivamani
Dore Abbey, monastery in Herefordshire, England
Doré bar or dore bar, also known as doré bullion, a low-purity bar of gold produced at a mine site
Dore Programme, brain training program for learning, attention, and social difficulties
 Doré Records, an American record label
 Doré v Barreau du Québec, a Supreme Court of Canada case
Castle Dore, hillfort in Cornwall, England

See also
Door
 La Dorée, a commune in the Mayenne department in northwestern France